Calbe (official name: Calbe (Saale)) is a town in the district of Salzlandkreis, in Saxony-Anhalt, Germany.

Geography 
It is known as Calbe an der Saale, to distinguish it from the smaller town of Kalbe on the Milde in the same state.

Historically it was a railway junction, and among its industries were wool-weaving and the manufacture of cloth, paper, stoves, sugar and bricks. Cucumbers and onions were cultivated, and soft coal was mined in the neighborhood.

The town has a statue of Roland outside its city hall. Roland is a symbol who represents many small and medium-sized towns in Saxony-Anhalt, symbolising free trade and prosperity. The town also has a very old church , and a tower known as the "Hexenturm" ("Witchtower"), in which the townspeople imprisoned accused witches and tortured them in the Middle Ages.

The river Saale runs on the east side of the town, and over a weir. This is a small kind of dam where the water flows over the structure allowing passage of shallow draft barges up or down — moreover rather than being channeled through it the water is used off this flow to generate energy and it raises the water level only a relatively small amount.

At the weir, the Saale is partly diverted, while some of the river flows over the weir and continues on its natural path, the rest is channeled through an artificial path, known as "Mühlgraben".  This takes the water between two (now abandoned) buildings which used to harness the power of the water to mill grain into flour, and the other to make paper.  After flowing between the mills, the water continues on an artificial path for a couple of miles before returning to the Saale proper.

The small island of land between the Saale and the artificial "Mühlgraben" is called "Heger" in German.  The local sports area and the swimming bath are located at the island. The island is connected to the city of Calbe by a bridge on the far side and also by a small ferry on the opposite side, which swings back and forth between the urban district "Gottesgnaden" (engl.: God's Grace) and island using an anchor and cable system.  The name of the town comes from the verb "kalben", which means to calf (for a cow to give birth) in German, but it could also come from the Latin adjective "calvus", which describes a bleak landscape. Calbe is famous for Bismarck's tower, which is located at the Wartenberg, and the long tradition for growing onions, which are regionally called "Bollen".

Personality

Sons and daughters of the town 

Anna Margareta von Haugwitz (1622–1673)
Carl Miller (1860–1930), local politician in Magdeburg
Constantin von Dietze (1891–1973), agricultural scientist and theologian
Hermann Bley (1936–2011), football player
Christina Berger (born 1946), professor of materials science at the Darmstadt University of Technology
Steffen Kammler (born 1965), Norwegian conductor

Personalities associated with Calbe 

 Till Eulenspiegel, trickster figure
 Wilhelm Loewe (1814–1886), politician, President of the Rump Parliament
 Marie Nathusius, (1817–1857), narrator
 Christian Scriver, (1629–1693), theologian

References 

Salzlandkreis